Tapolca is a district in south-western part of Veszprém County. Tapolca is also the name of the town where the district seat is found. The district is located in the Central Transdanubia Statistical Region.

Geography 
Tapolca District borders with Sümeg District and Ajka District to the north, Veszprém District and Balatonfüred District to the east, Fonyód District (Somogy County) to the south, Keszthely District (Zala County) to the west. The number of the inhabited places in Tapolca District is 33.

Municipalities 
The district has 2 towns, 1 large village and 30 villages.
(population as of 1 January 2013)

The bolded municipalities are cities, italics municipality is large village.

See also
List of cities and towns in Hungary

References

External links
 Postal codes of the Tapolca District

Districts in Veszprém County